This is a list of wars that began before 1000 AD. Other wars can be found in the historical lists of wars and the list of wars extended by diplomatic irregularity.

Prehistoric warfare
 Jebel Sahaba (14050 BC, ±2600 years)
Nataruk (c. 8050 BC, ±500 years)
Arnhem Land (c. 8000 BC)
Iberian Mediterranean Basin (Various paintings dating from 8000 to 3500 BC)
Morella la Vella (undated)
Les Dogue (undated)
Val del Charco del Agua Amarga (undated)
Schletz-Asparn (c. 5500 BC)
Schöneck-Kilianstädten (5028 BC, ±179 years)
 Talheim (c. 5000 BC)
 Schletz (c. 5000 BC)
 Ötztal Alps (c. 3230 BC)

3250–1000 BC

999 BC – 1 BC

1 AD – 1000 AD

References

0000-1000

Wars